Clemens August of Bavaria (17 August 1700 – 6 February 1761) was a member of the Wittelsbach dynasty of Bavaria and Archbishop-Elector of Cologne.

Biography
Clemens August (Clementus Augustus) was born in Brussels, the son of Elector Maximilian II Emanuel of Bavaria and Theresa Kunegunda Sobieska and the grandson of King John III Sobieski of Poland. His family was split during the War of the Spanish Succession and was for many years under house arrest in Austria; only in 1715 did the family become re-united.  

His uncle Joseph Clemens, Elector and Archbishop of Cologne, saw to it that Clemens August received several appointments in Altötting, the Diocese of Regensburg, and at the Prince-Provostry of Berchtesgaden, and he soon received papal confirmation as Bishop of Regensburg, and later of Cologne.

As Archbishop of Cologne, he was one of the Electors, a Prince-Bishop of Münster, Hildesheim, and Osnabrück, and a Grand Master of the Teutonic Order.

According to Jan Swafford, Clemens August did not owe his position of power to his "talent, intelligence or reason. In each of his exalted posts, Clemens August was splendidly brainless and incompetent, not in the least interested in governing anything. As Elector in Bonn, his attention would be given largely to pleasure in the form of ladies, music, dancing, and erecting monuments to his glory and munificence." (2014)

Clemens August, who mostly sided with the Austrian Habsburg-Lorraine side during the War of the Austrian Succession, personally crowned his brother Charles VII emperor at Frankfurt in 1742. After Charles's death in 1745, Clemens August then again leaned toward Austria. Over time, Clemens August changed more frequently the alliances, as of Allied of Austria or France, also under the influence of his frequently changing First Ministers and high donations.

He died in Festung Ehrenbreitstein in 1761. In March 1761, shortly after his death, Pope Clement XIII rejected the succession of Clemens August's brother Cardinal John Theodore of Bavaria as Archbishop and Prince-Elector of Cologne since the pope entertained some doubt on John Theodore's "moral conduct". This was the end of the reign of the Wittelsbach in Cologne after 178 years of continuous rule. In his will, Clemens August donated only to his successor as Elector and the court chamber of the Electorate of Cologne, but not the Elector of Bavaria. His nephew Maximilian III. Joseph then tried to challenge the will before the Supreme Court of Appeal, however, this failed on 23 January 1767.

Cultural legacy

Clemens August patronised the arts; among others he ordered to build the palaces of Augustusburg and Falkenlust in Brühl, North Rhine-Westphalia, listed on the UNESCO cultural world heritage list, and the church of St Michael in Berg am Laim in Munich. Ludwig van Beethoven's Flemish grandfather became a musician in Bonn during the reign of Clemens August.

Illegitimate children
Clemens August and his mistress Mechthild Brion had a daughter:
 Anna Marie zu Löwenfeld (1735–1783) who married Franz Ludwig, Count of Holnstein (1723–1780), son of Clemens August's brother Charles VII, Holy Roman Emperor

External links

Ancestors

Bibliography
Alessandro Cont, La Chiesa dei principi. Le relazioni tra Reichskirche, dinastie sovrane tedesche e stati italiani (1688-1763), preface of Elisabeth Garms-Cornides, Trento, Provincia autonoma di Trento, 2018, pp. 57-92, https://www.academia.edu/38170694/La_Chiesa_dei_principi._Le_relazioni_tra_Reichskirche_dinastie_sovrane_tedesche_e_stati_italiani_1688-1763_prefazione_di_Elisabeth_Garms-Cornides_Trento_Provincia_autonoma_di_Trento_2018
Jan Swafford, 'Beethoven, anguish and triumph', Boston, 2014, p. 6

References

External links

|-

1700 births
1761 deaths
House of Wittelsbach
Clemens August 1
Clemens August 1
Clemens August 1
Clemens August 1
Grand Masters of the Teutonic Order
Münster
Nobility from Brussels
Burials at Cologne Cathedral
Clemens August 01
Roman Catholic bishops of Regensburg
Clemens August 1
18th-century Roman Catholic bishops in Bavaria
German hunters
Sons of monarchs